Souto de Aguiar da Beira is a former freguesia ("civil parish") in Aguiar da Beira Municipality, Guarda District, Portugal. It was merged with Valverde in 2013 to form the new freguesia Souto de Aguiar da Beira e Valverde.

Demography

References 

Former parishes of Aguiar da Beira